Catherine Corsini (born 18 May 1956) is a French film director, screenwriter and actress. Her film Replay was entered into the 2001 Cannes Film Festival. Her 2012 film Three Worlds competed in the Un Certain Regard section at the 2012 Cannes Film Festival.

In April 2016, she was announced as the President of the Jury for the Caméra d'Or prize at the 2016 Cannes Film Festival. Corsini is partners with Elisabeth Perez, who has been a producer on some of her projects.

Filmography

See also
 List of female film and television directors
 List of lesbian filmmakers
 List of LGBT-related films directed by women

References

External links

1956 births
Living people
French film directors
French women film directors
French women screenwriters
French screenwriters
French lesbian artists
LGBT film directors
French LGBT screenwriters
People from Dreux
French lesbian writers
21st-century French LGBT people
21st-century French writers